Leptospira fainei is a pathogenic species of Leptospira, first isolated from pigs in Australia and named for University of Otago and Monash University microbiologist Dr. Solomon Faine.

References

Further reading

External links
LPSN
Type strain of Leptospira fainei at BacDive -  the Bacterial Diversity Metadatabase

fainei
Bacteria described in 1998